Ulrika Sjöwall (born 17 August 1971), is a Swedish athlete who competes in compound archery. She was the 2001 World Champion.

Her twin sister Jenny Sjöwall is also an archer, who has competed at the olympic level.

References

1971 births
Living people
Swedish female archers

World Archery Championships medalists
Competitors at the 2001 World Games
20th-century Swedish women